The 1974 Ball State Cardinals football team was an American football team that represented Ball State University as an independent during the 1974 NCAA Division I football season. In its fourth season under head coach Dave McClain, the team compiled a 6–4 record. The team played its home games at Ball State Stadium in Muncie, Indiana.

Running back Dave Blake rushed for 1,125 yards. Rick Clark set a Ball State record with 643 receiving yards. Quarterback Eric Scott set a Ball State career record with a .54187 pass completion percentage.

Schedule

References

Ball State
Ball State Cardinals football seasons
Ball State Cardinals football